Ben Walden (born 10 August 1969) is an English actor.
He is known for The Camomile Lawn (1992), The Man Who Cried (1993), Martin Chuzzlewit (1994), High Heels and Low Lifes (2001) and Band of Brothers (2001). He is the son of former Labour MP and political interviewer Brian Walden.

Career
In 1997, he acted in Thomas Middleton's play, A Chaste Maid in Cheapside, at Shakespeare's Globe theatre in London. Malcolm McKay was director.
In 1998, he acted in William Shakespeare's play, Richard III, at the Pleasance Theatre in London. Guy Retallack was director.
In 1999, he acted in Shakespeare's play Antony and Cleopatra at the Bankside Globe Theatre in London. Giles Block was director.

References

1969 births
Living people
English male film actors
English male stage actors
English male television actors